Abbarajupalem is a village in Palnadu district of the Indian state of Andhra Pradesh. It is located in Pedakurapadu mandal of Palnadu district.

Government and politics 

Abbarajupalem gram panchayat in Pedakurapadu mandal is the local self-government of the village. It is divided into wards and each ward is represented by a ward member. The ward members are headed by a Sarpanch. The village forms a part of Andhra Pradesh Capital Region and is under the jurisdiction of APCRDA.

Education 

As per the school information report for the academic year 2018–19, the village has only one primary school and one preschool (Anganvadi).

References

Villages in Palnadu district